Tverreggi is a mountain in Skjåk Municipality in Innlandet county, Norway. The mountain is surrounded by several other notable mountains including Dyringshøi and Søverhøi to the northeast, Leirvasshøi to the north, Sprongeggi to the south, and Rivenoskulen and Tverrådalskyrkja to the southeast.

See also
List of mountains of Norway

References

Skjåk
Mountains of Innlandet